Koonga was a municipality located in Pärnu County, one of the 15 counties of Estonia. In 2017, Koonga Parish, Hanila Parish, Lihula Parish, and Varbla Parish were merged to form Lääneranna Parish. It is one of the oldest known human settlement in Estonia.

Villages
Emmu
Hõbeda
Irta
Iska
Jänistvere
Järve
Joonuse
Kalli
Karinõmme
Karuba
Kibura
Kiisamaa
Kõima
Koonga
Kuhu
Kurese
Lõpe
Maikse
Mihkli
Naissoo
Nätsi
Nedrema
Õepa
Oidrema
Paimvere
Palatu 
Parasmaa
Peantse
Piisu
Pikavere
Rabavere
Salevere
Sookatse
Tamme
Tarva
Tõitse
Ura
Urita
Vastaba
Veltsa
Võitra
Võrungi

References 

Former municipalities of Estonia